is a Japanese singer-songwriter who is signed to SMAR. She keeps her personal information secret.

In 2020, she became one of five recipients of the Special Achievement Award at the 62nd Japan Record Awards.

Discography

Album

Singles

Promotional singles

Awards

References

External links
  
 （August 11, 2015–October 8, 2018） 
  
  
  (September 25, 2020–) 
  

Japanese women pop singers
Living people
Year of birth missing (living people)
21st-century Japanese women singers
21st-century Japanese singers